The 1922–23 Challenge Cup was the 23rd staging of rugby league's oldest knockout competition, the Challenge Cup.

First round

Second round

Quarterfinals

Semifinals

Final
Leeds defeat Hull F.C. 28-3 in the final at Belle Vue, Wakefield to win their second Challenge Cup in their second appearance.

Leeds: 28

Leeds Tries: Syd Walmsley, Harold Buck, Billy Bowen, Joe Brittain, Davies, Ashton

Leeds Goals: Joe Thompson 5

Hull FC: 3

Hull FC Tries: Jimmy Kennedy

Half-time: 10-0

Attendance: 29,335 (at Belle Vue, Wakefield)

References

Challenge Cup
Challenge Cup